Friedrich Otto Hörsing (18 July  1874 – 16 August 1937) was a German social democratic politician.

Biography 
Hörsing was born in Groß Schilleningken near Memel, East Prussia (today Šilininkai, Lithuania), and was trained to work as a blacksmith in his youth. He joined the Social Democratic Party (SPD) in 1894, became the Executive Secretary of the German Association of Metalworkers in Upper Silesia in 1905 and District Secretary of the SPD in Oppeln (1906–1914).

He served in the German Army in World War I and became a prisoner of war in Romania. After the war he returned to Silesia and became chairman of the Workers' and Soldiers' council of Upper Silesia in Kattowitz in 1919. 

In 1919 and 1920 Hörsing was the Reichs- und Staatskommissar for Silesia and Posen and the Oberpräsident of the Province of Saxony in 1920 until 1927.

He was a member of the Weimar National Assembly (1919), the Reichstag in 1919–22 and the Prussian Landtag (1924–1933). Hörsing represented the Province of Saxony in the Reichsrat in 1922–1930 and was a co-founder and the first Chairman of the Reichsbanner Schwarz-Rot-Gold (1924–32), which he described as a 'non-partisan protection organization of the Republic and democracy in the fight against the swastika and the soviet star'. In 1932, Hörsing founded the Sozial-Republikanische Partei Deutschlands after he was expelled from the SPD and the Reichsbanner. In the Reichstag election of November 1932, this new organization received only 8,395 votes.

Following the Nazi take over in 1933, they banned all opposition parties and discontinued Hörsing's pension benefits. He died impoverished in Berlin in 1937.

References

External links
 

1874 births
1937 deaths
People from Šilutė District Municipality
People from the Province of Prussia
Social Democratic Party of Germany politicians
Reichsbanner Schwarz-Rot-Gold members
Members of the Weimar National Assembly
Members of the Reichstag of the Weimar Republic
German Army personnel of World War I
Provincial Presidents of Saxony